The men's 89 kg (195.8 lbs) Semi-Contact category at the  W.A.K.O. World Championships 2007 in Coimbra was the third heaviest of the male Semi-Contact tournaments falling between the cruiserweight and heavyweight division when compared to Full-Contact's weight classes.  There were twelve fighters from four continents (Europe, Africa, North America and South America) taking part in the competition.  Each of the matches was three rounds of two minutes each and were fought under Semi-Contact rules.

Due to the low level of contestants, four of the fighters received a bye through to the quarter finals.  The tournament gold medallist was Great Britain's Michael Page who defeated Dave Heffernan from Ireland on points in the final.  Defeated semi finalists, Roberto Montuoro from Italy and Michael Simmons from the United States, won bronze.

Results
These matches were decided on points.

See also 
 List of WAKO Amateur World Championships
 List of WAKO Amateur European Championships
 List of male kickboxers

References

External links 
 WAKO World Association of Kickboxing Organizations Official Site

Kickboxing events at the WAKO World Championships 2007 Coimbra
2007 in kickboxing
Kickboxing in Portugal